The 1978 Australian Tourist Trophy was a motor race staged at the Calder circuit in Victoria, Australia on 3 December 1978. It was open to Group A Sports Cars and was recognized by the Confederation of Australian Motor Sport as an Australian Title. The race, which was the sixteenth Australian Tourist Trophy, was won by Greg Doidge driving an Elfin 360.

Results

Race statistics
 Race distance: 50 laps, 50 miles, 80.5 km
 Race time of winning car: 37:28.2
 Number of starters: 18
 Number of finishers: 8

References & notes

Australian Tourist Trophy
Tourist Trophy
Motorsport in Victoria (Australia)